Areyonga is a small town in the Northern Territory of Australia, located about  west of Alice Springs.  it had a population of about 195, most of whom are Aboriginal people of the Pitjantjatjara language group.

History
Areyonga was founded during the 1920s. A long drought forced Pitjantatjara families to leave Kaḻṯukatjara and other places in the Petermann Ranges. They originally moved to Hermannsburg and then set up a new community at Areyonga. A Lutheran mission was established in the settlement in the 1940s. In the 1970s, many people from the mission moved back to the community at Kaḻṯukatjara. The Lutheran mission at Areyonga was closed in 1990, and the land was given back to the native people as part of the Haasts Bluff Aboriginal Land Trust. The term "Finke River Mission" was initially an alternative name for the mission at Hermannsburg, but this name was later often used to include the settlements at Haasts Bluff, Areyonga and, later, Papunya. It now refers to all Lutheran missionary activity in Central Australia since the first mission was established at Hermannsburg in 1877.

Geography and location
Areyonga is in the valley of a deep and spectacular gorge. It has abundant flora and fauna along its creek bed and waterholes, including a large feral donkey population. It is a  detour from the Mereenie Loop for visitors coming through from Kings Canyon, and no permit is required to visit.

Governance
The town is governed by Areyonga Aboriginal Community.

Areyonga is located within the federal division of Lingiari, the territory electoral division of Stuart and the local government area of the MacDonnell Region.

Demographics
The 2016 Australian census which was conducted in August 2016 reports that Areyonga had 195 people living within its boundaries of which 176 (89.8%) identified as Aboriginal and/or Torres Strait Islander people. The people are mostly Pitjantjatjara, with some Arrernte and Walpiri families.

Art
It has a thriving Community Arts Centre with sought-after artists.

Pitjantjatjara artist, Bill Whiskey Tjapaltjarri worked at Areyonga.

References

External links
Community profile on the MacDonnell Shire website
Areyonga School

MacDonnell Region
Aboriginal communities in the Northern Territory
Pitjantjatjara